Stomp on Tripwires is the debut album from The Cops. It was released on 20 September 2004 on the Love Police Records label, and distributed through Reverberation.

Track listing
 "SPOC"
 "Foxtrot Yankee"
 "Cop City Music"
 "Rectify"
 "Be My Lover"
 "Dirty Little Rebel"
 "Mr Pretty Thing"
 "Wallet/Puffer/Smokes/Keys"
 "Street Panther"
 "Don't Fuck with My Sugar
 "She Sleeps With Guns"
 "The Shake"
 "Treat You Like A Dog"
 "Cobra Nights"
 "Fisticuffs"

 The opening track, 'SPOC', is a backwards version of a B-side called 'Chops' (which was only released on the Japanese version of the album).
 The other bonus track released on the Japanese version was entitled 'Get To Know Your Knees'.

Reviews
Triple J Album Review
Undercover.com.au
Australian Music Online Review
FasterLouder.com.au

References

External links
 The Cops Homepage

2004 debut albums
The Cops (Australian band) albums